Events from the year 1698 in France.

Incumbents 
Monarch: Louis XIV

Events
 
 
 
 
 
 24 October – Iberville and Bienville sail from Brest to the Gulf of Mexico to defend the southern borders of New France; they will eventually found three capitals of Louisiana (New France), as the future American cities: Mobile, Biloxi & New Orleans.

Births
 

 
 17 July – Pierre Louis Moreau de Maupertuis, French mathematician (d. 1759)
 6 September – Jean Thurel, French soldier (d. 1807)
 date unknown – Bernard Forest de Bélidor, French engineer (d. 1761)

Deaths
 

 10 January – Louis-Sébastien Le Nain de Tillemont, French historian (b. 1637)
 15 May – Marie Champmeslé, French actress (b. 1642)
 28 November – Louis de Buade de Frontenac, Governor of New France (b. 1622)

See also

References

1690s in France